Welcome to Eden is a Spanish thriller television series created by Joaquín Górriz and Guillermo López Sánchez for Netflix. It premiered on 6 May 2022. On 25 May 2022, Netflix reported that the series was renewed for a second season.

Cast

Production 
Welcome to Eden was created by Joaquín Górriz and Guillermo López. The series was produced by Brutal Media. Shooting locations in Spain included the province of Teruel, the island Lanzarote and San Sebastián.

On 25 May 2022, Netflix reported that the series was renewed for a second season, with Carlos Torres and Nona Sobo as cast additions, and Denis Rovira and Juanma Pachón in charge of the direction of the new episodes, already shooting.

Release 
The series premiered on 6 May 2022 on Netflix.

Episodes

Notes

References

External links
 

2022 Spanish television series debuts
Spanish-language television shows
2020s Spanish drama television series
Spanish thriller television series
Television shows filmed in Spain